Chaetanthera is a genus of South American flowering plants in the family Asteraceae.

 Species

References

External links 

Mutisieae
Asteraceae genera
Flora of South America